Lady Jessica is a fictional character in the Dune universe created by Frank Herbert. A main character in the 1965 novel Dune, Jessica also plays an important role in the later installment Children of Dune (1976). The events surrounding Jessica's conception, her birth and her early years with Leto are chronicled in the Prelude to Dune prequel trilogy (1999–2001) and the Caladan Trilogy (2020–2022) by Brian Herbert and Kevin J. Anderson. The character is brought back as a ghola in the Herbert/Anderson sequels which conclude the original series, Hunters of Dune (2006) and Sandworms of Dune (2007).

Lady Jessica was portrayed by Francesca Annis in the 1984 David Lynch film Dune. Saskia Reeves played the role in the 2000 Sci-Fi Channel TV miniseries Frank Herbert's Dune, and was succeeded by Alice Krige in the 2003 sequel, Frank Herbert's Children of Dune. Rebecca Ferguson portrays Jessica in the 2021 Denis Villeneuve film adaptation and its 2023 sequel.

Description
Jessica is described in Dune as having "hair like shaded bronze ... and green eyes" as well as an "oval face." This shape is later notable as a marker of Jessica's bloodline. Novelist Brian Herbert, Frank Herbert's son and biographer, said that the character of Lady Jessica is modeled after his mother and Frank Herbert's wife, Beverly Herbert. Brian Herbert wrote:

The original series

Dune
As Dune begins, Jessica is the Bene Gesserit concubine to the Duke Leto Atreides, and mother to his young son and heir Paul. Leto has been granted control of the lucrative planetary fief of Arrakis, and is moving his entire household there from his ocean homeworld of Caladan. Jessica's former instructor, the Bene Gesserit Reverend Mother Gaius Helen Mohiam, is still furious over Jessica's past insubordination—she had been instructed to bear Leto a daughter but had instead intentionally conceived a son—but Mohiam is somewhat intrigued by the potential she sees in 15-year-old Paul. Still, an Atreides daughter is a crucial part of the Bene Gesserit breeding program to eventually produce a super-being they call the Kwisatz Haderach.

Previously managed by House Atreides' longtime enemies, the Harkonnens, Arrakis is an inhospitable desert planet plagued by giant sandworms, and the only known source of melange, the valuable drug at the center of the galactic empire's economy. Leto suspects treachery on the part of Padishah Emperor Shaddam IV, but cannot refuse the assignment. Soon the Baron Harkonnen launches an attack, his forces secretly bolstered by Shaddam's fierce Sardaukar warriors and aided by Leto's own trusted Suk doctor, Wellington Yueh. Coerced by the Baron to save his wife from torture, Yueh disables the shields of the Atreides fortress and delivers a drugged Leto to the Baron, but also provides Leto with a false tooth filled with poison gas. Leto bites down on the tooth in the Baron's presence, but the gas only manages to kill Leto and the Baron's twisted Mentat, Piter De Vries. Jessica is drugged, bound and gagged to prevent her using her powers. The Baron orders that she and Paul be disposed of in the desert. Thanks to supplies left by Yueh, Paul and Lady Jessica escape into the desert and find refuge with the native Fremen. They take advantage of the legends planted there by the Bene Gesserit's Missionaria Protectiva, which practices religious engineering. Jessica casts Paul as the Lisan al'Gaib, the messiah, and herself as the Reverend Mother who shall bring him, even though she has not yet experienced the Bene Gesserit spice agony that transforms an acolyte into a full Reverend Mother. Jessica is also revealed to be the secret daughter of the Baron Harkonnen himself.

Paul soon molds the Fremen into a massive army with which he hopes to retake the planet from Imperial rule. The Fremen have their own "wild" Reverend Mothers, women who undergo their own version of the spice agony to awaken their Other Memory. Jessica undergoes the ritual of spice agony and replaces the dying Fremen Reverend Mother. But Jessica is pregnant during the ordeal, exposing the fetus to the same awakening of ancestral ego-memories. A child born this way is called an Abomination by the Bene Gesserit, because experiencing this heightened awareness before they have formed a personality of their own makes them vulnerable to eventually being overtaken by one of their ancestral personalities. Jessica's daughter Alia, a full Reverend Mother from birth, is a grown woman in a child's body. Paul's Fremen seize control of Arrakis from Shaddam and the Harkonnens, and Paul accedes to the throne as Emperor.

Paul is the Kwisatz Haderach, and eventually sets the Imperium on a course lasting thousands of years in the person of his son, Leto II. Much to the frustration of the Bene Gesserit, they do not control Paul, and the events of the coming millennia leave Jessica noteworthy as a figure of history who committed a great wrong (according to the Bene Gesserit); in the coming centuries, for a Bene Gesserit to choose her love over the instructions of her order is known as "the Jessica crime."

Children of Dune
By the time of Dune Messiah, Jessica has returned to Caladan, the ancestral home of the Atreides. She has also, by some accounts, returned to the Sisterhood following the death of her Duke, and while she cannot influence Paul, she does act as distant counselor. It is also implied that she and Atreides Weapons Master Gurney Halleck have become lovers.

In Children of Dune, Jessica returns to Dune to inspect Paul's children, Leto II and Ghanima, to see if they can be returned to the control of the Sisterhood. Leto notes the identity of Jessica's birth mother: Tanidia Nerus. Realizing that Alia is fully possessed, Jessica survives an assassination attempt by Alia and flees to the desert once more, taking refuge with Fremen leader (and old friend) Stilgar in Sietch Tabr. A civil war has divided Arrakis, with Fremen revolting against the transformation of the desert started by Pardot Kynes. Alia's husband, Duncan Idaho, also realizes that Alia is possessed. When Alia instructs Duncan to make her mother disappear, Duncan kidnaps her on the orders of the Preacher, a mysterious desert figure that some suspect is Paul Atreides, who disappeared into the desert. Duncan takes her to Salusa Secundus, the home of exiled House Corrino and the previous Emperor Shaddam IV. The Preacher has told Jessica, through Duncan, to train the pupil she finds there: Prince Farad'n, Shaddam's grandson. She trains him in the Bene Gesserit way, and at the end of Children of Dune, he becomes Ghanima's concubine and Leto's Royal Scribe.

Jessica is quoted via epigraph in Heretics of Dune:
When strangers meet, great allowance should be made for differences of custom and training. — The Lady Jessica, from Wisdom of Arrakis In Chapterhouse: Dune it is noted that she "lived out her years on Caladan." According to the Appendix IV: The Almanak en-Ashraf (Selected Excerpts of the Noble Houses) in Dune, Lady Jessica dies in the year 10,256 A.G. after 102 years of life.

Prelude to Dune
In the Prelude to Dune series, it is revealed that Jessica's mother is in fact Mohiam; according to the authors, this fact was pulled directly from Frank Herbert's working notes for the original Dune series. In the storyline, Mohiam blackmails the homosexual Baron Harkonnen into a sexual encounter; when the first daughter she conceives proves genetically undesirable, she is forced to return. At this point the Baron drugs and viciously rapes Mohiam, and in retribution she secretly infects him with the disease that will later leave him horribly obese. The daughter born of this second union is Jessica.

The Prelude series also follows Jessica and Leto's relationship from their first meeting through the birth (and subsequent kidnapping and return) of their son Paul. It is indicated that Jessica's choice to bear a son is partially due to her desire to help Leto overcome the devastating loss of his first son, Victor, by his concubine Kailea Vernius.

Journal entries are attributed to Jessica via epigraph in the Prelude to Dune series:
 The greatest and most important problems of life cannot be solved. They can only be outgrown. — Dune: House Harkonnen
 It is not easy for some men to know they have done evil, for reasoning and honor are often clouded by pride. — Dune: House Corrino
 There is no mystery about the source from which love draws its savage power: It comes from the flow of Life itself — a wild, torrential, outpouring that has its source in the most ancient of times... — Dune: House Corrino

In adaptations

1984 film
Lady Jessica was portrayed by Francesca Annis in the 1984 David Lynch film Dune. Richard Corliss of Time praised "the lustrous Francesca Annis ... who whispers her lines with the urgency of erotic revelation. In those moments when Annis is onscreen, Dune finds the emotional center that has eluded it in its parade of rococo decor and austere special effects. She reminds us of what movies can achieve when they have a heart as well as a mind."

2000 miniseries
Saskia Reeves played the role in the 2000 Sci-Fi Channel TV miniseries Frank Herbert's Dune. In her review of the 2000 miniseries, Emmet Asher-Perrin of Tor.com wrote that Reeves "embodies everything that you would expect from Lady Jessica in both bearing and commanding presence."

2003 miniseries
Reeves's real-life pregnancy forced producers to recast the role with Alice Krige for the 2003 sequel miniseries, Frank Herbert's Children of Dune. Laura Fries of Variety noted, "it's Susan Sarandon [as Farad'n's mother Wensicia] and Alice Krige who steal the thunder as opposing matriarchs of the great royal houses. Although the two never catfight, their ongoing struggle to rule the Dune dynasty gives this mini a real kick." Observing that Sarandon and Krige were "clearly relishing their roles", Fries added that "Sarandon makes a formidable enemy, while Krige, traditionally cast as the villain, proves she can work both sides of the moral fence." Asher-Perrin noted of the recast, "While it’s hard not to miss Reeves's elegance, there is an otherworldliness to Krige that suits a Bene Gesserit 'witch' superbly."

2021 and 2023 films
Rebecca Ferguson portrays Jessica in the 2021 Denis Villeneuve film Dune and its 2023 sequel Dune: Part Two. Ferguson explained, "She's a mother, she's a concubine, she’s a soldier. Denis was very respectful of Frank's work in the book, [but] the quality of the arcs for much of the women have been brought up to a new level. There were some shifts he did, and they are beautifully portrayed now."

Merchandising
A line of Dune action figures from toy company LJN was released to lackluster sales in 1984. Styled after David Lynch's film, the collection featured figures of various characters. A figure of Lady Jessica previewed in LJN's catalog was never produced.

Family tree

Notes and references

Dune (franchise) characters
Literary characters introduced in 1965
Fictional lords and ladies
Female characters in literature
Female characters in film